José Manuel López Rodríguez (born 21 February 1940) is a former Spanish cyclist. He competed in the individual road race and team time trial events at the 1964 Summer Olympics. He rode in 7 editions of the Vuelta a España and four times in the Tour de France.

Major results

1964
 5th Road race, Summer Olympics
1965
 1st Overall Circuit de la Sarthe
 2nd Team time trial, World Road Championships
 2nd Overall Tour de l'Avenir
1966
 1st GP Llodio
 1st Overall Setmana Catalana de Ciclisme
 3rd Trofeo Jaumendreu
1967
 2nd Klasika Primavera
 3rd GP Vizcaya
 6th Overall Vuelta a España
 9th Overall Tour de Suisse
1968
 1st GP Navarra
 1st Stages 3 & 7 Vuelta a Levante
1969
 1st Stage 9 Vuelta a España
 1st Stage 1 Vuelta a Levante
 2nd Prueba Villafranca de Ordizia
 2nd Overall Vuelta a Levante
 2nd Overall GP Leganes
 3rd GP Vizcaya
1970
 1st Six Days of Madrid (with Domingo Perurena)
 1st Stage 6 Vuelta a Levante
 1st Stage 4 Vuelta a La Rioja
 3rd Trofeo Elola
1971
 1st Overall Vuelta a Levante
1st Stage 1
 1st Stage 4 Setmana Catalana de Ciclisme
 2nd GP Pascuas
 2nd Klasika Primavera
 3rd Clásica Sabiñánigo
 3rd Overall GP Leganes
 3rd Prueba Villafranca de Ordizia
1972
 1st Trofeo Elola
 2nd Clásica Sabiñánigo
 2nd Overall GP Leganes
 3rd GP Llodio

Notes

References

External links
 

1940 births
Living people
Spanish male cyclists
Olympic cyclists of Spain
Cyclists at the 1964 Summer Olympics
Sportspeople from the Province of León
Cyclists from Castile and León